Sick of It is a British comedy-drama television series that premiered on Sky One on 27 September 2018. It was created and written by Karl Pilkington and Richard Yee (who also directed the series). Pilkington stars as both lead characters, playing his namesake Karl, and the voice inside his head that takes the form of his Doppelgänger.

The series is set around Ladbroke Grove in London and follows Karl, a bored taxi driver who has been dumped by his girlfriend Zoe and moves in with his elderly American aunt Norma, and is struggling to get his life back on track. Karl's closest companion is the voice in his head, a sardonic, outspoken alter ego who takes the form of his double – it's the uncensored true version of Karl that says what he really thinks without the risk of offending others. As Karl attempts to move on from the break up and sort out his life, the voice in his head appears periodically to guide, criticise and dispense his unorthodox philosophy of life.

Pilkington and Yee have worked together since 2009 on An Idiot Abroad and The Moaning of Life. Sick of It is the first scripted project they have collaborated on.

The show was renewed for a second series, which premiered in January 2020. In March 2020 in an interview with Lorraine Kelly on Lorraine, Pilkington stated that the second series would likely be the last.

Episodes

Series 1 (2018)

Series 2 (2020)

Cast 
Pilkington stars as the show’s two lead characters and appears in every episode. Sondra James plays his American Auntie Norma. In Series 2 Norma's carer Ruby is played by Marama Corlett who also becomes a love interest for Karl. Sick of It doesn’t have a regular fixed cast and instead features guest appearances each week from actors including Craig Parkinson, Kate Ashfield, Perry Benson, Finn Bennett, Remy Beasley, Mark Silcox, Raad Rawi, David Vujanic, Cokey Falcow, Lou Sanders, Shola Adewusi, Cavan Clerkin Julia Krynkeand & Doug Stanhope.

Reception 
Lucy Mangan from The Guardian gave the first two episodes 3 out of 5, observing, "It may not have been pure Pilkington, but perhaps in these melancholy times we couldn’t cope with that simple, shining joy anyway." Morgan Jeffery at RadioTimes.com gave the second series 4 stars out of 5, calling it "a smart, well-observed, touching and, yes, funny reflection on the intricacies and trivialities of modern life, and a step-up from the already formidable first series".

References

External links 
 
 
 

2018 British television series debuts
2020 British television series endings
2010s British comedy-drama television series
2020s British comedy-drama television series
Sky UK original programming
English-language television shows
Television shows set in the United Kingdom